Jennifer J. Wiseman is Senior Project Scientist on the Hubble Space Telescope, and an American astronomer, born in Mountain Home, Arkansas. She earned a bachelor's degree in physics from MIT and a Ph.D. in Astronomy from Harvard University in 1995. Wiseman discovered periodic comet 114P/Wiseman-Skiff while working as an undergraduate search assistant in 1987. Wiseman is a senior astrophysicist at the NASA Goddard Space Flight Center, where she serves as the Senior Project Scientist for the Hubble Space Telescope.   She previously headed the Laboratory for Exoplanets and Stellar Astrophysics.   She studies star forming regions of our galaxy using radio, optical, and infrared telescopes, with a particular interest in molecular cloud cores, protostars, and outflows. She led a major study that mapped a star forming region in the constellation Orion.

Wiseman is also interested in science policy and public science outreach and engagement. She has served as a congressional science fellow of the American Physical Society, an elected councilor of the American Astronomical Society and a public dialogue leader for the American Association for the Advancement of Science. She gives talks on the excitement of astronomy and scientific discovery, and has appeared in many science and news venues including The New York Times, The Washington Post, NOVA and National Public Radio.

Wiseman is a Christian and a Fellow of the American Scientific Affiliation and a member of the BioLogos Board of Directors. On June 16, 2010, Wiseman was introduced as the new director for the American Association for the Advancement of Science's (AAAS) program, Dialogue on Science, Ethics, and Religion. She has continued to work for AAAS, speaking  to organizations about her beliefs on Christianity and Science.

Awards 

 Hubble Fellow – 1998
 Jansky Fellow – 1995Kdid’lele

See also
List of women in leadership positions on astronomical instrumentation projects

References

American women astronomers
NASA astrophysicists
American Christians
MIT Department of Physics alumni
Harvard Graduate School of Arts and Sciences alumni
Hubble Fellows
Living people
People from Mountain Home, Arkansas
Year of birth missing (living people)
Women planetary scientists
Planetary scientists
Scientists from Arkansas
20th-century American astronomers
20th-century American women scientists
21st-century American astronomers
21st-century American women scientists